Events in the year 2018 in Turkmenistan.

Incumbents
 President: Gurbanguly Berdimuhamedow

Events
25 March – Turkmen parliamentary election, 2018

Deaths

3 January – Medeniyet Shahberdiyeva, opera singer (b. 1930).

27 April – Maya Kuliyeva, operatic soprano and actress (b. 1920)

References

 
2010s in Turkmenistan 
Years of the 21st century in Turkmenistan 
Turkmenistan 
Turkmenistan